Matías Pardo (born 17 March 1988) is an Argentine footballer who plays as a defender. He is currently a free agent.

Career
Pardo began his career with Victoriano Arenas, first participating in a senior match for the club in 2008. After three years and four goals in fifty-one Primera D Metropolitana fixtures, Pardo moved to Primera B Metropolitana side Acassuso. He made his professional bow for them in 2013. Months later, Sportivo Barracas of the fifth tier signed Pardo. 2014 saw the defender join Liniers. Having spent two years with them, they won promotion to Primera C Metropolitana in 2016; before returning to Primera D Metropolitana twelve months later. He subsequently departed Liniers, after one goal in forty-six encounters.

Career statistics
.

References

External links

1988 births
Living people
Sportspeople from Lanús
Argentine footballers
Association football defenders
Primera D Metropolitana players
Primera B Metropolitana players
Primera C Metropolitana players
Victoriano Arenas players
Club Atlético Acassuso footballers
Sportivo Barracas players
Club Social y Deportivo Liniers players